Anois (Irish: Now) was an Irish-language weekly newspaper, published in Dublin, Ireland, by Gael Linn from September 1984 until June 1996. It was the first newspaper in the Irish language to appear in full-colour tabloid format. It focused primarily on Irish language issues, and included regular columns on sport and entertainment, as well as sections for children and learners.

Anois replaced two other Irish-language newspapers, Inniu and Amárach, and was itself replaced by Foinse in October 1996. It was financed by Roinn na Gaeltachta, as well as by sales and advertising. In 1986 its circulation stood at around 5,600, and about 4,500 in 1989.

Notable contributors
Máire Breatnach
Rónán Mac Aodha Bhuí
Tomás Mac Síomóin
Gabriel Rosenstock
Colm Ó Snodaigh

Notes

1984 establishments in Ireland
1996 disestablishments in Ireland
Defunct newspapers published in Ireland
Defunct weekly newspapers
Irish-language newspapers
Publications established in 1984
Publications disestablished in 1996
Weekly newspapers published in Ireland